Joe Maggio is an American film director, screenwriter, and producer. He is best known for his work on the films Virgil Bliss, Paper Covers Rock, Bitter Feast, and The Last Rites of Joe May. He is also one of the founding editors of the NYC-based literary and culture tabloid The Brooklyn Rail.

Life and career
Maggio was born in Buffalo, New York. He graduated with a BA from Rutgers University.

Maggio's debut feature film, Virgil Bliss (2001), was nominated for two Independent Spirit Awards, including The John Cassavetes Award. His second film, Milk and Honey (2003), premiered at the Sundance Film Festival and won a Special Jury Prize for Best Screenplay at the Atlanta Film Festival in 2003. His third film, Paper Covers Rock (IFC Films), premiered at South by Southwest in 2008.

In 2010, Maggio's film, Bitter Feast, premiered at the Los Angeles Film Festival. In 2011, his film, The Last Rites of Joe May, premiered at the Tribeca Film Festival and also nominated for Best Narrative Feature at the Tribeca Film Festival. His sixth feature film, Supermoto, premiered at the Minneapolis–Saint Paul International Film Festival.

Maggio has collaborated with Vincent D'Onofrio on three radio plays, Man on the Ledge (2010), Ram King (2013), and Cannibals (2015), as part of the series Tales from Beyond the Pale, hosted by Larry Fessenden. He is currently working on a feature documentary, Gary from Omaha, about one man's hunt for a mythical creature in the wilds of Oregon's Blue Mountains.

In 2020, Maggio joined the faculty of Emerson College where he teaches in the Visual Media Arts (VMA) Department. He is currently in post-production on the feature film Bliss (2023), which is the second installment of his Virgil Bliss trilogy.

Filmography

References

External links 
 
 

American film directors
American male screenwriters
American film producers
Living people
Year of birth missing (living people)